Hi, Neighbor is a 1942 American comedy film directed by Charles Lamont and written by Dorrell McGowan and Stuart E. McGowan. The film stars Jean Parker, John Archer, Janet Beecher, Marilyn Hare, Bill Shirley and Pauline Drake. The film was released on July 27, 1942, by Republic Pictures.

Plot

Cast   
Jean Parker as Dorothy Greenfield
John Archer as Dr. Hall
Janet Beecher as Hattie Greenfield
Marilyn Hare as Mary Lou
Bill Shirley as Dick
Pauline Drake as Amelia White
Fred Sherman as Mr. Brown
Myrtle Wiseman as Lulubelle 
Scotty Wiseman as Scotty 
Barbara Jo Allen as Vera Greenfield 
Don Wilson as Radio Announcer
Roy Acuff as Roy Acuff
Harry Cheshire as Professor Edgar Boggs 
Lillian Randolph as Birdie

References

External links
 

1942 films
American comedy films
1942 comedy films
Republic Pictures films
Films directed by Charles Lamont
American black-and-white films
1940s English-language films
1940s American films